Wiltshire Council is a council for the unitary authority of Wiltshire (excluding the separate unitary authority of Swindon) in South West England, created in 2009. It is the successor authority to Wiltshire County Council (1889–2009) and the four district councils of Kennet, North Wiltshire, Salisbury, and West Wiltshire, all of which were created in 1974 and abolished in 2009.

Establishment of the unitary authority 
The ceremonial county of Wiltshire consists of two unitary authority areas, Wiltshire and Swindon, administered respectively by Wiltshire Council and Swindon Borough Council. Before 2009, Wiltshire was administered as a non-metropolitan county by Wiltshire County Council, with four districts, Kennet, North Wiltshire, Salisbury, and West Wiltshire. Swindon, in the north of the county, had been a separate unitary authority since 1997, and on 5 December 2007 the Government announced that the rest of Wiltshire would move to unitary status. This was later put into effect by a statutory instrument as part of the 2009 structural changes to local government in England.

With the abolition of the District of Salisbury, a new Salisbury City Council was created at the same time to carry out several citywide functions and to hold the City's charter.

Functions 
The unitary authority provides local government services to 435,000 Wiltshire residents and is also the biggest employer in Wiltshire, being responsible for schools, social services, rubbish collection and disposal, county roads, planning, and leisure services.

Most executive decisions are taken by the authority's cabinet, each member of which has a particular area of responsibility. Development control is undertaken by five planning committees, the powers of which cannot be exercised by the cabinet. Members of the authority are appointed to a wide range of outside bodies, providing them with some element of democratic accountability, such as the Kennet and Avon Canal Trust, the Wiltshire Victoria County History, and the Wiltshire Historic Buildings Trust.

Political balance 

As a result of the first elections to the new authority, plus two by-elections held in September 2009 and December 2010, an Independent joining UKIP while remaining in the Independent group, a defection in May 2012 by a Liberal Democrat councillor to the Conservatives, and in November 2012 by another Lib Dem and a Conservative to the Independents, by the beginning of 2013 Wiltshire Council consisted of 61 Conservatives, 22 Liberal Democrats, ten Independents including one UKIP member, three Devizes Guardians, and two Labour members.

The elections of 2013 produced an unexpected swing to the Liberal Democrats, who made a net gain of five seats, while all three Devizes Guardians lost their seats to the Conservatives and the Labour group increased from two to four. The overall result was 58 Conservatives, 27 Liberals, eight Independents, four Labour, and one UKIP member. However, during the following year four Liberal Democrats defected from their political group: one to the Conservatives and three to the Independents. In a by-election in May 2015 at Chippenham Hardenhuish, the Conservatives gained a seat from the Liberal Democrats, and in November they gained another at Salisbury St Edmund. At a by-election in May 2016 the Liberal Democrats gained Amesbury East from the Conservatives.

The 2017 election resulted in the Conservatives increasing their share of seats at the expense of the Liberal Democrats, Independents, Labour and UKIP. This trend reversed, however, in 2021 with the Liberal Democrats increasing their number to 27 – their joint highest since the creation of the council.

Following the death of Conservative councillor Mary Webb in August 2022, a by-election was called to be held in Salisbury St Paul's ward on 3 November for both Wiltshire Council and Salisbury City Council. The Liberal Democrats gained the seat, giving them their largest number of seats since the creation of the council.

Divisions

Wiltshire Council has 98 divisions, each represented by one elected member.

County Hall 
Wiltshire Council operates from the same Trowbridge base as its predecessor, Wiltshire County Council. In 2012 the County Hall was renovated and expanded at a cost of about £24 million. Services provided to the public in the building include the Trowbridge library, and the main office of the council's Registration Service.

See also 
 List of civil parishes in Wiltshire
 List of places in Wiltshire
 Wiltshire and Swindon History Centre
 Wiltshire Library and Information Service

Notes

References

External links 
 
 Wiltshire census statistics at statistics.gov.uk
 Wiltshire Joint Strategic Assessments
 Wiltshire Council official tourism website

Politics of Wiltshire
Unitary authority councils of England
Local government districts of South West England
Leader and cabinet executives
Local education authorities in England
Local authorities in Wiltshire
Billing authorities in England